The Kimberley Regiment is an infantry regiment of the South African Army. As a reserve unit, it has a status roughly equivalent to that of a British Army Reserve or United States Army National Guard unit.

History

Volunteer Forces on the Diamond Fields

The regiment's origins lie in the early, lawless, diamond rush days in Kimberley in the 1870s.  To bring law and order to the region, which was then known as Griqualand West, the government encouraged the formation of part-time volunteer forces.  Among them were the Kimberley Light Horse and the Du Toitspan Hussars, both formed in 1876, which amalgamated in 1877 to form the Diamond Fields Horse.  Volunteers from the DFH served in the 9th Frontier War in 1877, in operations in Griqualand West in 1878, and in the Basutoland Gun War in 1880 and 1881.

Kimberley later raised two more units, the Victoria Rifles of Kimberley in 1887, and the Kimberley Scots in 1890.  They, along with the Diamond Fields Artillery, amalgamated in 1890 to form the Kimberley Rifles.  Both the DFH and the Kimberley Rifles served in the 1896-1897 Bechuanaland campaign.  In 1899, the two units amalgamated to form the Kimberley Regiment.

Regimental traditions have survived from each of the constituent cavalry, artillery and rifle units, with a distinctly Scottish element very much in evidence in the uniforms, pipe band and regimental culture to this day.

Anglo Boer War
During the Anglo-Boer War of 1899 to 1902, the Regiment helped to defend the city during the four-month-long Siege of Kimberley. It is one of only two regiments of the British Empire holding as a Battle Honour the defence of its own city - in this instance Defence of Kimberley.

Union Defence Force
On 1 July 1913 the Regiment was embodied in the Citizen Force of the Union Defence Forces, as the 7th Infantry (Kimberley Regiment).

World War One
During World War I, it fought in the German South-West Africa campaign in 1915, providing two battalions. It further provided 'C' Company of the composite 1st Regiment of the 1st South African Brigade which fought in France. At Delville Wood, Private William Faulds (later Captain ) was the only South African to be awarded the Victoria Cross for his part in that epic battle.

The title of the Regiment reverted to Kimberley Regiment in 1932.

World War Two
During World War II, the Kimberley Regiment fought in Italy in 1944 and 1945, forming the Motor Battalion together with the Imperial Light Horse Regiment in the Armoured Brigade of the 6th South African Armoured Division throughout the Italian Campaign. Winning Battle Honours and awards for bravery, the Kimberley Regiment also suffered more casualties than any other South African regiment in the campaign.

Border War
Kimberley Regiment was the first to become officially bilingual (English and Afrikaans) in South Africa, in 1963. It was later, in 1977, the first South African Regiment to apply to become multiracial, although the request was not approved at the time.

The regiment served in the South African Border War in the 1970s and 1980s.

SANDF Era
Since 1994 it has been deployed in peace-keeping roles in the Sudan and the Democratic Republic of Congo.

Leadership

Alliances
 - The Duke of Lancaster's Regiment (King's Lancashire and Border)

Battle honours

The twenty authorised Battle Honours on the Regimental Colour include:

Insignia

Current Dress Insignia

See also
 Kimberley Star

References

Infantry regiments of South Africa
Military units and formations established in 1876
Military units and formations in Kimberley
Military units and formations of the Second Boer War
Military units and formations of the British Empire
Military units and formations of South Africa in the Border War
Military units and formations of South Africa in World War I
1876 establishments in Griqualand West